Viktor Pinsky (born February 6, 1964, Lida, Grodno Region) is a Russian political figure and a deputy of the 6th, 7th, and 8th State Dumas. 

From 1987 to 1989, he was the head of the office of the military court of Petropavlovsk-Kamchatsky. Then, until 1996, he served as a judge of the military court of the city of Fokino, Primorsky Krai. From 2000 to 2005, Pinsky was the deputy of the Legislative Assembly of Primorsky Krai. In 2011, he was elected deputy of the 6th State Duma from the Primorsky Krai constituency. In 2016 and 2021, he was re-elected for the 7th and 8th State Dumas, respectively.

At the State Duma, Pinsky voted for the scandalous Dima Yakovlev Law, Yarovaya law, for increasing the pension age, and other laws that are popularly known as "anti-national".

References

1964 births
Living people
United Russia politicians
21st-century Russian politicians
Eighth convocation members of the State Duma (Russian Federation)
Seventh convocation members of the State Duma (Russian Federation)
Sixth convocation members of the State Duma (Russian Federation)